14 teams participated in the 1993–94 Egyptian Premier League season. The first team in the league was the champion, and was supposed to qualify to the African Cup of Champions Clubs, but this did not happen as Al Ahly was boycotting the CAF competitions so the Runner up Ismaily qualified instead.
Al Ahly managed to win the league for the 23rd time in the club's history.

League table

Title playoff

Top goalscorers

References

1993–94 in African association football leagues
0
Premier